Brian Iwuh (born March 8, 1984) is a former American football linebacker who played for six seasons in the National Football League (NFL). After playing college football for Colorado, he was signed by the Jacksonville Jaguars as an undrafted free agent in 2006. He played for the Jaguars for four seasons, the Chicago Bears for two seasons, and the Denver Broncos in the 2011–12 NFL playoffs.

Early years
Iwuh played high school football at Worthing High School in Houston, Texas. He earned All-League honors for three straight years. He also lettered in track, basketball and swimming.

College career
Iwuh played college football at Colorado. During his senior year, he earned All-Big 12 Conference honors. He finished his college career with 216 tackles, 23 sacks and five interceptions.

Professional career

Jacksonville Jaguars
Iwuh was signed by the Jacksonville Jaguars as an undrafted free agent in 2006. He was released on April 26, 2010.

Chicago Bears
Iwuh signed with the Chicago Bears on May 24, 2010. He was waived on November 29, 2011.

Denver Broncos
Iwuh signed with the Denver Broncos on January 3, 2012.

References

External links
Chicago Bears bio
Jacksonville Jaguars bio

1984 births
Living people
Players of American football from Houston
American football linebackers
American people of Igbo descent
Igbo sportspeople
American sportspeople of Nigerian descent
Colorado Buffaloes football players
Jacksonville Jaguars players
Chicago Bears players
Denver Broncos players